Daniel Buck (September 28, 1829 – May 21, 1905) was an American attorney, politician, and jurist.

Early life and education 
Born in Boonville, New York, Buck studied law at New York Law School and was admitted to the New York State Bar Association.

Career 
Buck moved to Minnesota Territory in 1857 and eventually settled in the area that became Mankato, Minnesota. Buck was a central figure in the founding of the Village of Mankato, the Mankato Normal School, and the Mankato Area Chamber of Commerce. In 1866, Buck served in the Minnesota House of Representatives as a Democrat and then served in the Minnesota Senate from 1879 to 1883. Buck also served on the Minnesota State Normal School Board and Mankato School Board. Buck was an associate justice of the Minnesota Supreme Court from 1894 until 1899 when he resigned due to his wife's ill health. In 1904, Buck published his book on the Indian troubles in Minnesota, especially for the Spirit Lake actions. He intended his book Indian Outbreaks to be a judicially impartial account.

Personal life 
Buck died in Mankato, Minnesota.

References

1829 births
1905 deaths
Politicians from Mankato, Minnesota
People from Boonville, New York
New York Law School alumni
New York (state) lawyers
Justices of the Minnesota Supreme Court
Democratic Party members of the Minnesota House of Representatives
Democratic Party Minnesota state senators
School board members in Minnesota
19th-century American politicians
19th-century American judges